Records and statistics in relation to the Italian football club Associazione Sportiva Roma.

Serie A records
Updated 22 July 2020
 Home Victory: 9–0 v Cremonese, 13 October 1929
 Away victory: 6–1 v Alessandria, 6 January 1935 & 6–1 v SPAL, 22 July 2020
 Home Draw with most goals: 4–4 v Catania, 31 May 1964 & 4–4 v Napoli, 20 October 2007
 Away draw with most goals: 4–4 v Milan, 27 January 1935 & 4–4 v Chievo, 30 April 2006
 Home Defeat: 1–7 v Torino, 5 October 1947
 Away defeat: 1–7 v Juventus, 6 March 1932
 Most points in a season (3 pts per win): 87 (2016–17, 38 games)
 Most points in a season (2 pts per win): 43 (1982–83, 30 games)
 Most victories in a season: 28 (2016–17)
 Fewest victories in a season: 8 (1964–65, 34 games & 1992–93, 34 games)
 Fewest defeats in a season: 2 (1980–81, 34 games & 2001–02, 34 games)
 Most goals scored in a season (by team): 87 (1930–31, 34 games), 90 (2016–17, 38 games)
 Most goals scored in a season: 29 Rodolfo Volk (1930–31, 34 games), Edin Džeko (2016–17, 37 games)
 Lowest goals against in a season (by team): 15 (1974–75, 30 games)
 Longest winning streak: 11 begun on 21 December 2005 (4–0 v Chievo), ended on 5 March 2006 (1–1 v Internazionale)
 Longest unbeaten run: 24 begun on 23 September 2001 (2–1 v Fiorentina), ended on 24 March 2002 (1–3 v Internazionale) & 24 begun on 1 November 2009 (2–1 v Bologna), ended on 25 April 2010 (1–2 v Sampdoria) 
 Most appearances: 619, Francesco Totti
 Most goals scored: 250, Francesco Totti

All competitions appearances 
A.S. Roma players with 300 or more appearances. 
Updated 23 October 2018

Players in bold are currently playing for Roma.

Top all-time goalscorers
Updated 28 July 2021 

Players in bold are currently playing for Roma.

Capocannoniere winners

International honours won while playing at Roma

FIFA World Cup
The following players have won the FIFA World Cup while playing for A.S. Roma:
 Guido Masetti – 1934, 1938
 Attilio Ferraris – 1934
 Enrique Guaita – 1934
 Aldo Donati – 1938
 Eraldo Monzeglio – 1938
 Pietro Serantoni – 1938
 Bruno Conti – 1982
 Thomas Berthold – 1990
 Rudi Völler – 1990
 Aldair – 1994
 Vincent Candela – 1998
 Cafu – 2002
 Francesco Totti – 2006
 Daniele De Rossi – 2006
 Simone Perrotta – 2006
 Paulo Dybala – 2022

FIFA Confederations Cup

The following players have won the FIFA Confederations Cup while playing for A.S. Roma:
 Claudio Caniggia – 1992
 Aldair – 1997
 Cafu – 1997
 Juan – 2009
 Júlio Baptista – 2009
 Antonio Rüdiger – 2017

UEFA European Championship
The following players have won the UEFA European Championship while playing for A.S. Roma:
 Vincent Candela – 2000
 Traianos Dellas – 2004
 Bryan Cristante – 2020
 Leonardo Spinazzola – 2020

Copa América
The following players have won the Copa América while playing for A.S. Roma:
 Renato Gaúcho – 1989
 Daniel Fonseca – 1995
 Aldair – 1997
 Antônio Carlos – 1999
 Cafu – 1999
 Mancini – 2004
 Doni – 2007

Africa Cup of Nations
The following players have won the Africa Cup of Nations while playing for A.S. Roma:
 Gervinho - 2015
 Seydou Doumbia - 2015

International records
 Home victory: 10–1 v Altay (1st round, Fair Cup 1962–63)
 Away victory: 7–1 v Gent, 6 August 2009
 Home defeat: 1–7 v Bayern Munich, 22 October 2014
 Away defeat: 1–7 v Manchester United, 10 April 2007
 Away defeat: 0-8 v Ferencvarosi TC, 22 June 1935

European football

Achievements

References 

Roma
Statistics